WQLA (960 AM) is a radio station licensed to La Follette, Tennessee.

History
On September 6, 2014, Jenn Media, Inc., completed the sale of WQLA to Michael and Sue Beverly's Beverly Broadcasting Co., LLC.

Effective May 5, 2016, Beverly Broadcasting sold WQLA to Ron Meredith’s Clinton Broadcasters, Inc. Coincidentally, WQLA changed their format from classic hits to classic country, simulcasting WYSH 1380 AM Clinton, TN.
Meredith has grown the station to be a favorite in the Campbell County area of East Tennessee.

On May 1, 2022, WQLA dropped its simulcast with WYSH and changed their format from classic country to classic rock, branded as "95.9 Rocks".

References

External links

QLA
Campbell County, Tennessee
Radio stations established in 1983
1983 establishments in Tennessee
Classic rock radio stations in the United States